Nysa (minor planet designation: 44 Nysa) is a large and very bright main-belt asteroid, and the brightest member of the Nysian asteroid family. It is classified as a rare class E asteroid and is probably the largest of this type (though 55 Pandora is only slightly smaller).

Discovery 
It was discovered by Hermann Goldschmidt on May 27, 1857, and named after the mythical land of Nysa in Greek mythology.

Physical properties 
In 2002 Kaasalainen et al. used 63 lightcurves from the Uppsala Asteroid Photometric Catalog (UAPC) to construct a shape model of 44 Nysa. The shape model is conical, which they interpreted as indicating the asteroid may actually be a contact binary.

In 2003, Tanga et al. published results obtained from the Fine Guidance Sensor on the Hubble Space Telescope in which high-precision interferometry was performed on Nysa with the goal of a more accurate shape determination. Due to Hubble's orbit around the Earth, hours-long photometry sessions, as are normally used to resolve the asteroid's shape, were not possible. Instead, the team used interferometry on the asteroid at the time in its rotation when it would have its longest axis perpendicular to the Earth. Ellipsoidal shape models were then fit to the resulting data to determine an estimate of the asteroid's shape. Both single and double ellipsoid models were fit to the data with both providing approximately the same goodness of fit; leaving the team unable to differentiate between a single elongated object and the contact binary model put forth by Kaasalainen et al.
An observation of an occultation by 44 Nysa of TYC 6273-01033-1 from the Dutch amateur astronomer Harrie Rutten showed a two-phase reappearance on March 20, 2012. This confirms the conical shape or the binary nature of Nysa.

In December 2006, Shepard et al. performed three days of radar observations on Nysa with the Arecibo radio telescope. The asteroid was found to have a high radar polarization value (μc) of 0.50 ± 0.2, a radar albedo of 0.19 ± 0.06, and a visual albedo (pv) of 0.44 ± 0.10. The albedo measurements were based on a shape model worked out at Arecibo. The best fit shape model as measured by the Arecibo team has parameters a/b = 1.7 ± 0.1, a/c = 1.6–1.9, with an a-axis of 113 ± 10 km; this gives an effective diameter of 79 ± 10 km, which is in agreement with the HST study by Tanga et al. in 2003. The data gathered also showed signs of significant concavity in Nysa's structure, but the dip in the radar curves is not pronounced enough to indicate bifurcation, calling into question whether or not Nysa really is a contact binary.

Nysa has so far been reported occulting a star three times.

Studies
44 Nysa was in a study of asteroids using the Hubble FGS. Asteroids studied include (63) Ausonia,  (15) Eunomia, (43) Ariadne, (44) Nysa, and (624) Hektor.

See also 
 Aubrite
 E-type asteroid
 Hungaria family
 64 Angelina
 3103 Eger
 55 Pandora
 2867 Šteins
 2015 TC25 (Thought to have broken off of 44 Nysa)

References

Further reading

External links 
 
 

Nysa asteroids
Nysa
Nysa
E-type asteroids (Tholen)
Xc-type asteroids (SMASS)
18570527

vec:Lista de asteroidi#44 Nisa